Y2K is the eleventh studio album by Beenie Man.

Track listing
"Woman Ah Modler" – 3:35
"Boogie Down" – 3:48
"Miss Angela" (featuring Christina) – 3:53
"Feel Good" (featuring Leroy Sibbles) – 3:50
"Recruiting Girl" – 3:35
"Illiterate Gal"– 3:35
"Matey" – 3:27
"Veteran" – 3:34
"AIDS Veteran (Remix)" – 3:29
"Fuck Hawk" – 3:42
"Greendelero (Remix)” – 3:37
"Green Card Buddy" - 3:37

Notes
The vinyl pressing of the album omits the tracks "Feel Good" and "Green Card Buddy".
Track 9, "AIDS Veteran (Remix)" is a remix of the song, "AIDS Victim", but is erroneously listed as "AIDS Veteran".

Charts

References

Beenie Man albums
1999 albums